Kaiden Brand (born 8 April 1994) is an Australian rules football player who plays with the West Adelaide Football Club in the South Australian National Football League. He previously played with the Hawthorn Football Club and Sydney Swans in the Australian Football League.

AFL career
Hawthorn selected him with pick 66 in the 2012 AFL Draft.

In between seasons Brand bulked up considerably, played every game for 2014, mainly at full-back and performed well at Box Hill. Brand has elite pace, has the ability to play on talls and smalls and has solid foot skills.
 
Hurt his left shoulder in the opening minute of his NAB Cup debut in 2015.  With advice from the club, Brand had both shoulders reconstructed and missed the entire season.

He returned in good form in 2016 and with the retirement of Brian Lake a spot has opened for him in the Hawthorn backline. A concussion to James Frawley meant he was promoted to play against Richmond.

Following the 2019 season, Brand was delisted by Hawthorn. After spending 2 years at the Sydney Swans he returned home to South Australia to play for West Adelaide and was named captain in 2023.

Statistics

|- style=background:#EAEAEA
| 2013 ||  || 42
| 0 || — || — || — || — || — || — || — || — || — || — || — || — || — || — || 0
|-
| 2014 ||  || 42
| 0 || — || — || — || — || — || — || — || — || — || — || — || — || — || — || 0
|- style=background:#EAEAEA
| 2015 ||  || 30
| 0 || — || — || — || — || — || — || — || — || — || — || — || — || — || — || 0
|-
| 2016 ||  || 30
| 11 || 0 || 0 || 86 || 56 || 142 || 47 || 14 || 0.0 || 0.0 || 7.8 || 5.1 || 12.9 || 4.3 || 1.3 || 0
|- style=background:#EAEAEA
| 2017 ||  || 30
| 17 || 0 || 0 || 161 || 111 || 272 || 104 || 19 || 0.0 || 0.0 || 9.5 || 6.5 || 16.0 || 6.1 || 1.1 || 0
|-
| 2018 ||  || 30
| 10 || 0 || 0 || 76 || 47 || 123 || 47 || 14 || 0.0 || 0.0 || 7.6 || 4.7 || 12.3 || 4.7 || 1.4 || 0
|- style=background:#EAEAEA
| 2019 ||  || 30
| 5 || 0 || 0 || 34 || 22 || 56 || 20 || 6 || 0.0 || 0.0 || 6.8 || 4.4 || 11.2 || 4.0 || 1.2 || 0
|-
| 2020 ||  || 2
| 2 || 0 || 0 || 10 || 8 || 18 || 7 || 3 || 0.0 || 0.0 || 5.0 || 4.0 || 9.0 || 3.5 || 1.5 || 0
|- style=background:#EAEAEA
| 2021 ||  || 2
| 3 || 0 || 0 || 22 || 16 || 38 || 19 || 6 || 0.0 || 0.0 || 7.3 || 5.3 || 12.7 || 6.3 || 2.0 || 0
|- class="sortbottom"
! colspan=3| Career''
! 48 !! 0 !! 0 !! 389 !! 260 !! 649 !! 235 !! 62 !! 0.0 !! 0.0 !! 8.1 !! 5.4 !! 13.5 !! 4.9 !! 1.3 !! 0
|}

Notes

Honours and achievements
Team
 VFL premiership player: 2018

Individual
  best first year player (debut season): 2016
 SANFL State Representative: 2022
 West Adelaide Football Club Captain: 2023

References

External links

1994 births
Living people
West Adelaide Football Club players
Hawthorn Football Club players
Box Hill Football Club players
Australian rules footballers from South Australia
Sydney Swans players